is a passenger railway station in the city of Hitachiōmiya, Ibaraki, Japan operated by East Japan Railway Company (JR East).

Lines
Nogamihara Station is served by the Suigun Line, and is located 32.5 rail kilometers from the official starting point of the line at Mito Station.

Station layout
The station consists of a single side platform serving traffic in both directions. There is no station building.  The station is unattended.

History
Nogamihara Station opened on November 19, 1956. The station was absorbed into the JR East network upon the privatization of the Japanese National Railways (JNR) on April 1, 1987.

Surrounding area

 Nogamihara Danchi

See also
List of railway stations in Japan

External links

  JR East Station information 

Railway stations in Ibaraki Prefecture
Suigun Line
Railway stations in Japan opened in 1956
Hitachiōmiya, Ibaraki